Lakshman Acharya is an Indian politician and who is currently serving as Governor of Sikkim. He was the member of the Bharatiya Janata Party. Acharya is a member of the Uttar Pradesh Legislative Council from the Varanasi Division Graduates Constituency in Varanasi district. He is related to kharwar tribes. Kharwar is  a schedule tribe, its origin from Mirzapur district of Uttar Pradesh.

References 

Politicians from Varanasi
Bharatiya Janata Party politicians from Uttar Pradesh
Members of the Uttar Pradesh Legislative Council
Living people
21st-century Indian politicians
Year of birth missing (living people)